Maxime Vantomme (born 8 March 1986) is a Belgian professional racing cyclist, who currently rides for Belgian amateur team CT Borgonjon–Dewasport.

Major results

2002
 1st Gouden Fiets
2004
 1st Overall Keizer der Juniores Koksijde
2005
 2nd Zuidkempense Pijl
 2nd Paris–Tours Espoirs
 3rd Road race, National Under-23 Road Championships
 3rd Memorial Van Coningsloo
2006
 1st Memorial Danny Jonckheere Oudenburg
 1st Stage 2 Ronde de l'Oise
 3rd Brussel–Zepperen
 10th Kampioenschap van Vlaanderen
2007
 1st Memorial Danny Jonckheere Oudenburg
 1st Stage 1a Tour des Pays de Savoie
 3rd GP Stad Geel
2008
 1st Stage 3 La Tropicale Amissa Bongo
 8th Halle–Ingooigem
 10th Ronde van Noord-Holland
2009
 6th Nokere Koerse
 7th Grote Prijs Jef Scherens
 7th GP Gemeente Kortemark
2010
 2nd Grote Prijs Jef Scherens
 5th Overall Tour de Wallonie
 6th Tour de Vendée
 10th Classica Sarda
2011
 5th Textielprijs
 9th Handzame Classic
 10th Overall Tour of Belgium
 10th Grand Prix de Wallonie
2012
 1st Heistse Pijl
 6th Le Samyn
 8th Overall Ster ZLM Toer
 8th Nokere Koerse
2013
 2nd Puivelde Koerse
 4th Circuit de Wallonie
 5th Dutch Food Valley Classic
 7th Overall Tour du Poitou-Charentes
 7th Grand Prix d'Ouverture La Marseillaise
 7th Grand Prix de la Somme
 8th Overall Arctic Race of Norway
 10th Grand Prix Criquielion
2014
 1st  Overall Paris–Arras Tour
1st Stage 1 (TTT)
 1st Le Samyn
 4th Grand Prix de Plumelec-Morbihan
2015
 1st Paris-Chauny
2017
 2nd Overall Circuit des Ardennes
1st Stage 3
 3rd Dwars door de Vlaamse Ardennen
 3rd Famenne Ardenne Classic
 6th Overall Three Days of De Panne
 7th Tour de l'Eurométropole
 8th Overall Étoile de Bessèges
 8th Overall Ster ZLM Toer
2018
 9th Nokere Koerse

References

External links
 
 
 

1986 births
Living people
People from Menen
Belgian male cyclists
Cyclo-cross cyclists
Cyclists from West Flanders